Randall Robinson (born July 6, 1941) is an African-American lawyer, author and activist, noted as the founder of TransAfrica. He is known particularly for his impassioned opposition to apartheid, and for his advocacy on behalf of Haitian immigrants and Haitian president Jean-Bertrand Aristide.  Due to his frustration with American society, Robinson emigrated to St. Kitts in 2001.

Early life and education

Robinson was born in Richmond, Virginia, to Maxie Cleveland Robinson and Doris Robinson Griffin, both teachers. The late ABC News anchorman, Max Robinson, was his elder brother. Randall Robinson graduated from Virginia Union University, and earned a J.D. degree at Harvard Law School.
He also has an older sister, actress Jewel Robinson, and a younger sister, Pastor Jean Robinson. Both sisters live and work in the Washington, D.C. area.

He and his former wife had a daughter, Anike Robinson, and a son, Jabari Robinson. He is married to Hazel Ross-Robinson and they have one daughter, Khalea Ross Robinson.

Career

Robinson was a civil rights attorney in Boston (1971–75) before he worked for U.S. Congressman Bill Clay (1975) and as administrative assistant to Congressman Charles Diggs (1976).  He was a Ford fellow.

Robinson founded the TransAfrica Forum in 1977, which according to its mission statement – serves as a "major research, educational and organizing institution for the African-American community, offering constructive analysis concerning U.S. policy as it affects Africa and the African Diaspora (African Americans and West Indians who can trace their heritage back to the dispersion of Africans that occurred as a result of the Transatlantic slave trade) in the Caribbean and Latin America." He served in the capacity as TransAfrica's president until 2001.

During that period he gained visibility for his political activism, organizing sit-ins at the South African embassy in order to protest the Afrikaner government's racial policy of discrimination against black South Africans, a personal hunger strike aimed at pressuring the United States government into restoring Jean-Bertrand Aristide to power after the short-lived coup by General Raoul Cédras, and dumping crates filled with bananas onto the steps of the United States Trade Representative in order to protest what he views as discriminatory trade policies aimed at Caribbean nations, such as protective tariffs and import quotas.

In 2001, he authored the book The Debt: What America Owes To Blacks, which presented an in-depth outline regarding his belief that wide-scale reparations should be offered to African Americans as a means to redress centuries of de jure and de facto discrimination and oppression directed at the group. The book argues for the enactment of lineage-based reparation programs as restitution for the continued social and economic issues in the African-American community, such as a high proportion of incarcerated black citizens and the differential in cumulative wealth between white and black Americans.

In 2003, Robinson turned down an honorary degree from Georgetown University Law Center.

Robinson began teaching at the Dickinson School of Law at Penn State University in the fall of 2008.

Emigration

In 2001, Robinson quit his position as head of TransAfrica and decided to emigrate to St. Kitts – where his wife, who is a member of a prominent Kittitian family, was born – a decision chronicled in his book Quitting America: The Departure of a Black Man from his Native Land.

Robinson's decision to emigrate was caused by what he describes as his antipathy towards America's domestic policies and foreign policy, both of which he believes exploit minorities and the poor.

References

Publications

 
 
 An Unbroken Agony: Haiti, From Revolution to the Kidnapping of a President, Perseus Books Group, 2007. 
 Quitting America: The Departure of a Black Man From His Native Land, Plume Books (Reprint), 2004. 
 The Reckoning: What Blacks Owe to Each Other, Plume (Reprint), 2002. 
 The Debt: What America Owes to Blacks, Plume, 2001. 
 Defending the Spirit, Plume, (1999).

External links 

 
 Randall Robinson interviewed on Conversations from Penn State
 Randall Robinson on Democracy Now
 Huffington Post biography
 African American Registry biography
 "Randall Robinson: Aristide Says 'Tell the World It Is a Coup'". Interview by Amy Goodman on Democracy Now!
 
 In Depth interview with Robinson, February 3, 2013
 Review of Randall Robinson, Alex Dupuy, and Peter Hallward books on Haiti NACLA, 2008

1941 births
Living people
African-American lawyers
African-American non-fiction writers
American non-fiction writers
Activists for African-American civil rights
American human rights activists
Historians of Haiti
Harvard Law School alumni
Virginia Union University alumni
Norfolk State University alumni
Lawyers from Richmond, Virginia
People from Saint Kitts
American emigrants to Saint Kitts and Nevis
Recipients of the Order of the Companions of O. R. Tambo
Saint Kitts and Nevis people of African American descent
Norfolk State Spartans men's basketball players
American men's basketball players
American reparationists
Hunger strikers
21st-century African-American people
20th-century African-American people